This is the complete list of women's Olympic medalists in rowing.

Current program

Single sculls

Double sculls

Quadruple sculls
Note: coxed event (1976–1984), coxless event (1988–)

Coxless pairs

Coxless four

Coxed eight

Lightweight double sculls

Discontinued events

Coxed four

References
International Olympic Committee results database

Rowing (women)
medalists
Rowing

Oly